Harold Boyce Budd Jr. (born January 4, 1939) is a retired American competition rower who won a gold medal in the eights at the 1964 Olympics.

Budd graduated from Yale University in 1961, and then joined Philadelphia's Vesper Boat Club, winning with them national titles in the pairs, fours, and eights in 1964 and 1965. He also won a bronze medal in the eights at the 1965 European championships. In 1962, he spent a year at Cambridge University in England, and won with them the Henley Royal Regatta in the eights.

In 1980, Budd's home in Devon, Pennsylvania, was robbed; his Olympic gold medal was stolen and never recovered.

References

1939 births
Rowers at the 1964 Summer Olympics
Olympic gold medalists for the United States in rowing
Cambridge University Boat Club rowers
Living people
American male rowers
Medalists at the 1964 Summer Olympics
Sportspeople from Summit, New Jersey
European Rowing Championships medalists